Edward Paul Mitchell, Jr. (July 23, 1901 – June 25, 1970) was an American rower who competed in the 1924 Summer Olympics. In 1924 he won the bronze medal as member of the American boat in the coxed four event.

References

1901 births
1970 deaths
Rowers at the 1924 Summer Olympics
Olympic bronze medalists for the United States in rowing
American male rowers
Medalists at the 1924 Summer Olympics